The Hannibal Locks and Dam are a United States Army Corps of Engineers concrete locks and lift gate dam, located at river mile marker 126.4 on the Ohio River at Hannibal, Ohio, and New Martinsville, West Virginia. The locks and dam were built to replace the wicket-type locks and dams Number 12, 13 and 14. Construction on the locks were started in 1967 and completed in 1972. Construction on the dams were started in 1970 and completed in 1975.

A 37.4 MW hydroelectric power plant is located on the left descending bank of the Ohio River at New Martinsville, West Virginia, abutted to the dam. The power plant is owned and operated by the City of New Martinsville.

An observation tower, along with public-use areas, picnic shelters and restroom facilities are available to groups and individuals during daylight hours, seven days a week.

See also
List of locks and dams of the Ohio River
List of crossings of the Ohio River

References

Dams completed in 1975
Dams in Ohio
Dams on the Ohio River
Buildings and structures in Monroe County, Ohio
Buildings and structures in Wetzel County, West Virginia
Transportation in Wetzel County, West Virginia
Tourist attractions in Wetzel County, West Virginia
Transportation in Monroe County, Ohio
Tourist attractions in Monroe County, Ohio
United States Army Corps of Engineers dams
Locks of West Virginia
Locks of Ohio
1975 establishments in Ohio
1975 establishments in West Virginia